My Kind of Music is a British game show.

The title may also refer to:
My Kind of Music (Mel Tormé album)
My Kind of Music (Ray Scott album), or its title track